The House of Ascania was a dynasty of German rulers. It is also known as the House of Anhalt, which refers to its longest-held possession, Anhalt.

The Ascanians are named after Ascania (or Ascaria) Castle, known as Schloss Askanien in German, which was located near and named after Aschersleben. The castle was the seat of the County of Ascania, a title that was later subsumed into the titles of the princes of Anhalt.

History

The earliest known member of the house, Esiko, Count of Ballenstedt, first appears in a document of 1036. He is assumed to have been a grandson (through his mother) of Odo I, Margrave of the Saxon Ostmark. From Odo, the Ascanians inherited large properties in the Saxon Eastern March.

Esiko's grandson was Otto, Count of Ballenstedt, who died in 1123. By Otto's marriage to Eilika, daughter of Magnus, Duke of Saxony, the Ascanians became heirs to half of the property of the House of Billung, former dukes of Saxony.

Otto's son, Albert the Bear, became, with the help of his mother's inheritance, the first Ascanian duke of Saxony in 1139. However, he soon lost control of Saxony to the rival House of Guelph.

Albert inherited the Margraviate of Brandenburg in 1157 from its last Wendish ruler, Pribislav, and he became the first Ascanian margrave. Albert, and his descendants of the House of Ascania, then made considerable progress in Christianizing and Germanizing the lands. As a borderland between German and Slavic cultures, the country was known as a march.

In 1237 and 1244, two towns, Cölln and Berlin, were founded during the rule of Otto and Johann, grandsons of Margrave Albert the Bear. Later, they were united into one city, Berlin. The emblem of the House of Ascania, a red eagle and bear, became the heraldic emblems of Berlin. In 1320, the Brandenburg Ascanian line came to an end.

After the Emperor had deposed the Guelph rulers of Saxony in 1180, Ascanians returned to rule the Duchy of Saxony, which had been reduced to its eastern half by the Emperor. However, even in eastern Saxony, the Ascanians could establish control only in limited areas, mostly near the River Elbe.

In the 13th century, the Principality of Anhalt was split off from the Duchy of Saxony. Later, the remaining state was split into Saxe-Lauenburg and Saxe-Wittenberg. The Ascanian dynasties in the two Saxon states became extinct in 1689 and in 1422, respectively, but Ascanians continued to rule in the smaller state of Anhalt and its various subdivisions until the monarchy was abolished in 1918.

Catherine the Great, Empress of Russia from 1762 to 1796, was a member of the House of Ascania, herself the daughter of Christian August, Prince of Anhalt-Zerbst.

Rulers of the House of Ascania

House of Ascania

Partitions of the House of Ascania

Table of rulers

List of states ruled by the House of Ascania
 County, Principality, and Duchy of Anhalt: c. 1100–1918
 Duchy and Electorate of Saxony: 1112, 1139–1142, 1180–1422
 County of Weimar-Orlamünde: 1112–1486
 Margravate of Brandenburg: 1157–1320
 Duchy of Saxe-Lauenburg: 1269–1689
 Principality of Lüneburg: 1369–1388
 Principality and Duchy of Anhalt-Bernburg: 1252–1468 and 1603–1863
 Principality of Anhalt-Zerbst: 1252–1396 and 1544–1796
 Principality of Anhalt-Aschersleben: 1252–1315
 Principality and Duchy of Anhalt-Köthen: 1396–1561 and 1603–1847
 Principality and Duchy of Anhalt-Dessau 1396–1561 and 1603–1863
 Principality of Anhalt-Plötzkau 1544–1553 and 1603–1665
 Principality of Anhalt-Harzgerode 1635–1709
 Principality of Anhalt-Mühlingen: 1667–1714
 Principality of Anhalt-Dornburg: 1667–1742
 Principality of Anhalt-Bernburg-Schaumburg-Hoym: 1718–1812
 Russian Empire: 1762–1796

References
 Askanien, Meyers Konversationslexikon, 1888
 Trillmich, Werner, Kaiser Konrad II. und seine Zeit, Bonn, 1991

External links

Ducal Family of Anhalt (House of Ascania) – official website
European Heraldry page
 (first page of a series)
Stirnet: Brandenburg1  (genealogy of the Houses of Ascania and Brandenburg, including the most likely ancestry of the 11th-century House of Ascania)
Stirnet: Ascania1  (an alternate possible ancestry of the 11th-century House of Ascania)

 
Saxon nobility